Head Wound City is the debut self-titled EP by the hardcore punk supergroup Head Wound City. It was released in 2005.

Musically it is very similar to Jordan Blilie's work with The Blood Brothers, combined with styles similar to The Locust (which includes members Justin Pearson and Gabe Serbian).

Track listing
 Radical Friends – 1:41
 I'm a Taxidermist – I'll Stuff Anything – 1:01
 Prick Class – 1:29
 Street College – 0:57
 New Soak for an Empty Pocket – 1:18
 Thrash Zoo – 0:53
 Michael J. Fux Featuring Gnarls in Charge – 2:23

2005 EPs
Head Wound City albums